Guanaba is a semi-rural locality in the City of Gold Coast, Queensland, Australia.

Geography
The locality consists of small acreages focused around the equestrian community.

The eastern boundary of Guanaba follows the Coomera River.

History
Guanaba State School was established circa March 1930 using a school building relocated from the former Carrara State School in 1929. It was officially opened on Arbor Day circa June 1930. It closed circa 1942.

The median age of the Guanaba population was 43 years, 6 years above the national median of 37.  74.1% of people living in Guanaba were born in Australia. The other top responses for country of birth were England 7.5%, New Zealand 4.6%, Netherlands 1.5%, Germany 1.3%, Ireland 0.9%. 91.7% of people spoke only English at home; the next most common languages were 1% Mandarin, 0.8% Dutch, 0.6% German, 0.4% French, 0.4% Greek.

Amenities
It is home to the Gold Coast Polo and Country Club.

References

Further reading
 —includes Guanaba State School

External links
  — includes Guanaba

Suburbs of the Gold Coast, Queensland
Localities in Queensland